Zylberberg is a surname. Notable people with the surname include:

 Fernando Zylberberg (born 1977), Argentine field hockey player
 Julieta Zylberberg (born 1983), Argentine actress
 Régine Zylberberg (1929 - 2022), French singer
 Joel Hyatt Zylberberg (born 1950), American entrepreneur and politician